Ernestokokenia is an extinct genus of mammal, belonging to the Didolodontidae. It lived during the Early Eocene and the Middle Eocene, and its fossils were discovered in South America.

Description

This genus is only known from its teeth, and it is then impossible to reconstruct its exact appearance. From comparison with similar and better known animals such as Didolodus, its size is estimated between 60 centimeters and a meter long. Ernestokokenia was characterized by very simple molars and premolars, with a bunodont structure, similar to those of Didolodus. The upper third and fourth molar were differently shaped and lacked a mesostyle. The labial and lingual cingulum were well developed.

Classification

Ernestokokenia was a member of the Didolodontidae, an enigmatic clade of south-american mammals typicals of the early Cenozoic, of uncertain relationships. The first fossils of this animal were found in the Chubut Province in Patagonia (Argentina), in soils dated from the Middle Eocene, and were described by Florentino Ameghino in 1901. The type species is Ernestokokenia nitida. Ameghino described also Notoprotogonia patagonica and Euprotogonia trigonalis, later attributed to the genus by George Gaylord Simpson in 1948. In 1935, Simpson had described two other species, Ernestokokenia chaishoer and E. yurunhor, from the same Chubut Province, and from the Lower Eocene. Other fossils dubiously attributed to the genus have been found in soils of the Upper Paleocene of Argentina and the Eocene of Chile.

Bibliography

F. Ameghino. 1901. Notices préliminaires sur des ongulés nouveaux des terrains crétacés de Patagonie [Preliminary notes on new ungulates from the Cretaceous terrains of Patagonia]. Boletin de la Academia Nacional de Ciencias de Córdoba 16:349-429
G. G. Simpson. 1935. Descriptions of the oldest known South American mammals, from the Rio Chico Formation. American Museum Novitates 793:1-25
G. G. Simpson. 1948. The beginning of the age of mammals in South America. Part I. Bulletin of the American Museum of Natural History 91:1-232
C. d. Paula Couto. 1952. Fossil mammals from the beginning of the Cenozoic in Brazil. Condylarthra, Litopterna, Xenungulata, and Astrapotheria. Bulletin of the American Museum of Natural History 99(6):355-394
R. Cifelli. 1983. The origin and affinities of the South American Condylarthra and early Tertiary Litopterna (Mammalia). American Museum Novitates 2772:1-49
A. R. Wyss, M. A. Norell, M. J. Novacek and J. J. Flynn. 1992. New ?early Tertiary localities from the Chilean Andes. Journal of Vertebrate Paleontology 12(3 Supp.):61A
J. N. Gelfo. 2010. The "condylarth" Didolodontidae from Gran Barranca: history of the bunodont South American mammals until the Eocene-Oligocene transition. In R. H. Madden, A. A. Carlini, M. G. Vucetich, R. F. Kay (eds.), The Paleontology of Gran Barranca: Evolution and Environmental Change through the Middle Cenozoic of Patagonia 130-142
E. V. Oliveira and F. J. Goin. 2011. A reassessment of bunodont metatherians from the Paleogene of Itaborai (Brazil): Systematics and the age of the Itaborian SALMA. Revista Brasileira de Paleontologia 14(2):105-136

Didolodontids
Condylarths
Eocene mammals of South America
Paleogene Argentina
Fossils of Argentina
Fossil taxa described in 1901
Taxa named by Florentino Ameghino
Prehistoric placental genera
Golfo San Jorge Basin
Sarmiento Formation